Skinner Building may refer to:

Skinner Building (Albuquerque, New Mexico), listed on the National Register of Historic Places in Bernalillo County, New Mexico
Skinner Building (Seattle), listed on the National Register of Historic Places in King County, Washington